Hukani-ye Olya (also Romanized as Hūkānī-ye ‘Olyā; also known as Hawa Kanī, Hūkānī, and Hūkānī-ye Sabzeh ‘Olyā) is a village in Howmeh-ye Kerend Rural District, in the Central District of Dalahu County, Kermanshah Province, Iran. At the 2006 census, its population was 124, in 24 families.

References 

Populated places in Dalahu County